The color eggshell is meant as a representation of the average color of a chicken egg.  

In interior design, the color eggshell is commonly used when one desires a pale, warm, neutral, off-white color.

Paint gloss
Eggshell paint also refers to a type of hard-wearing wall paint with the same matte sheen as an egg's shell, rather than the same color; consequently eggshell paint can be any color, not just off-white.

See also
Robin egg blue, also known as eggshell blue

List of colors

References 

Shades of white